"Those Damned Blue-Collar Tweekers" is a song by the American rock band Primus. It was released as the third single from their 1991 album Sailing the Seas of Cheese. Unlike its preceding singles "Jerry Was a Race Car Driver" and "Tommy the Cat", "Tweekers" did not feature an accompanying video. The song opens with Larry LaLonde on guitar and a reserved bassline from Les Claypool, from there alternating between his trademark slap bass and a quiet section for the vocals.

The song's narrative describes several different trades that the town's blue collar tweekers engage in, but, like many of the other story-telling songs in Primus's catalogue, lacks any clear, single meaning and leaves plenty of ambiguity in its lyrics. The song is about truck drivers and "blue-collar workers" using methamphetamine.

Live
When performing live, Claypool changed a particular word in the lyrics. In the third verse, instead of "my eyes are growing weary as I finalize this song," it is now ""my eyes are growing weary as I sodomize this song..."

The band's Woodstock 1994 performance of the song was particularly notable, with Claypool beginning a bass rendition of the Star Spangled Banner in homage to Jimi Hendrix's guitar performance of the national anthem decades before, but eventually apologizing to the crowd by saying "Sorry, I had to do it" and returning to the song.

As of 2015, it is Primus's second most-performed song live. A live version of the song (performed at Primus' show at the Brixton Academy, London, England on July 13, 2011) also appears as an iTunes exclusive bonus track on the band's 2011 album, Green Naugahyde. 

Primus often use animated clips from the online animated series Salad Fingers.

References

Primus (band) songs
1991 singles
1991 songs
Songs written by Les Claypool
Songs written by Larry LaLonde
Songs written by Tim Alexander
Interscope Records singles
Songs about drugs